The 2016 Colonial Athletic Association women's basketball tournament was held March 9–12, 2016 at the Show Place Arena in Upper Marlboro, Maryland.

Seeds

Schedule

Bracket

See also
 2016 CAA men's basketball tournament

References

External links
 2016 CAA Women's Basketball Championship

Colonial Athletic Association women's basketball tournament
 
CAA women's basketball tournament
CAA women's basketball tournament
Sports competitions in Prince George's County, Maryland
College basketball tournaments in Maryland
Women's sports in Maryland